Verdon Township is a township in Aitkin County, Minnesota, United States. The population was 45 as of the 2010 census.

Etymology
Verdon Township was named for Verdon Wells, son of the town's postmaster, E. B. Wells.

Geography

Major highway
  Minnesota State Highway 65

Lakes
 Oxbow Lake

Adjacent townships
 Ball Bluff Township (northeast)
 Cornish Township (east)
 Turner Township (southeast)
 Libby Township (south)

Cemeteries
The township contains Verdon Cemetery.

Demographics
As of the census of 2000, there were 44 people, 23 households, and 14 families residing in the township. The population density was 1.2 people per square mile (0.5/km). There were 44 housing units at an average density of 1.2/sq mi (0.5/km). The racial makeup of the township was 95.45% White, 2.27% African American and 2.27% Asian.

There were 23 households, out of which 4.3% had children under the age of 18 living with them, 65.2% were married couples living together, and 34.8% were non-families. 34.8% of all households were made up of individuals, and 13.0% had someone living alone who was 65 years of age or older. The average household size was 1.91 and the average family size was 2.40.

In the township the population was spread out, with 6.8% under the age of 18, 9.1% from 18 to 24, 13.6% from 25 to 44, 34.1% from 45 to 64, and 36.4% who were 65 years of age or older. The median age was 58 years. For every 100 females, there were 158.8 males. For every 100 females age 18 and over, there were 156.3 males.

The median income for a household in the township was $39,375, and the median income for a family was $38,125. Males had a median income of $14,375 versus $39,375 for females. The per capita income for the township was $20,226. There were no families and 13.0% of the population living below the poverty line, including no under eighteens and 16.7% of those over 64.

References
 United States National Atlas
 United States Census Bureau 2007 TIGER/Line Shapefiles
 United States Board on Geographic Names (GNIS)

Townships in Aitkin County, Minnesota
Townships in Minnesota